F. laeta may refer to:

 Ficus laeta, a hemiepiphytic tree
 Frontina laeta, a tachina fly
 Frontinella laeta, a sheet weaver